is Japanese singer Ringo Sheena's 2nd single and it was released on September 9, 1998 by Toshiba EMI, East World. It was certified gold for 100,000 downloads to cellphones by the RIAJ in 2011.

Background 
M1 is the song which Ringo Sheena wrote imagining Kabuki-cho before she actually visited there.
M2 is a cover of Cyndi Lauper's song. However, she referred to Susanna Hoffs version.
The Japanese translation appeared in the liner notes is the lyrics which Sheena translated freely. 
M3 is the songs in which she recorded "Kabukichō no Joō" and "Marunouchi Sadistic" in the style of singing to her own guitar accompaniment.
She actually sang in outdoor at first.
Since it didn’t sound like reality, she re-recorded it in studio and added sound effects, such as footsteps and noises of bustle.

The song was used as the theme song for the NHK music show Pop Jam in 1998 and in a Suntory commercial for The Cocktail Bar Mimosa. The song was covered as a part of a medley by Rie Tomosaka on the television show The Yoru mo Hippare on September 9, 2000. It was covered again by Yoshihiro Kai on his album 10 Stories (2007), in English by Allister member Scott Murphy from his album Guilty Pleasures 3 (2008), on Fragrance's album Colorful (2009) and by the Gypsy Vagabonz on G-Jazz Swing Cover (2011).

Track listing

Chart rankings

Sales and certifications

Credits and personnel 
Kabukichō no Joō
 
 Vocals, drums, whistle: Ringo Sheena
 Electric Guitar, acoustic Guitar: Susumu Nishikawa
 Electric Bass, handclap: Seiji Kameda

Unconditional Love 
 Vocals: Ringo Sheena
 The strings: Chieko Kinbara Group 
 Bell & loops: Seiji Kameda
 Synthesizer programming: Hiroshi Kitashiro

References 

Ringo Sheena songs
1998 songs
1998 singles
Songs written by Ringo Sheena
Song recordings produced by Seiji Kameda